This Is th' Life is a 1914 American silent short film directed by Henry Otto starring Charlotte Burton, George Field, Ed Coxen, Edith Borella, and John Steppling.

External links

1914 films
American silent short films
American black-and-white films
Films directed by Henry Otto
1910s American films